Marieke Aleida Westerhof (born 14 August 1974 in Denekamp, Overijssel) is a retired rower from the Netherlands. She won a silver medal in the women's eight with coxswain in the 2000 Summer Olympics in Sydney, Australia. Four years earlier, at the 1996 Summer Olympics in Atlanta, United States, Westerhof was part of the Dutch women's eight that finished sixth in the Olympic final.

References

  Dutch Olympic Committee

1974 births
Living people
People from Denekamp
Dutch female rowers
Rowers at the 1996 Summer Olympics
Rowers at the 2000 Summer Olympics
Olympic rowers of the Netherlands
Olympic silver medalists for the Netherlands
Olympic medalists in rowing
Medalists at the 2000 Summer Olympics
20th-century Dutch women
21st-century Dutch women
Sportspeople from Overijssel